Necrosis is the fourth studio album by the Norwegian death metal band Cadaver. A video was released for the song "Decomposed Metal Skin".

Track listing
  "Necro as Fuck"   – 3:24 
  "Decomposed Metal Skin"   – 3:22 
  "Evil Is Done"   – 5:00 
  "Odium"   – 4:32 
  "Awakening"   – 3:53 
  "Goatfather"   – 3:43 
  "Unholy Death"   – 2:47 
  "The Etching Cleanser"   – 3:38 
  "Heartworm"   – 4:33

Credits
Apollyon - Vocals, Bass
Neddo - Guitar
L.J. Balvaz - Guitar
Czral - Drums
Bjørn Boge ( Ursus Major) (a.k.a. Bjørn Bogus) - Engineering, mixing and production at Sound Residence Studios, Oslo, Norway
Bredo Myrvang - Assistant engineering
Øystein Boge - Drum technician
Audun Strype - Mastering at Strype Audio, Oslo, Norway

References

Cadaver (band) albums
2004 albums